Robert Jamieson may refer to:

 Robert Jamieson (moderator) (1802-1880) Moderator of the General Assembly of the Church of Scotland in 1872
 Bob Jamieson, American television journalist
 Craig Jamieson (Robert Craig Jamieson, born 1953), Cambridge academic
 Robert Jamieson (antiquary) (1772–1844), Scottish antiquary
 Robert Jamieson (merchant) (died 1861), London promoter of West African commerce
 Robert Jamieson (1802–1880), co-editor of the Jamieson-Fausset-Brown Bible Commentary
 Robert Jamieson (chess player) (born 1952), Australian chess player
 Robert Alan Jamieson (born 1958), Shetland dialect poet and novelist
 Robert Stuart Jamieson (1922–2006), musician, author, engineer, inventor, and patent agent

See also
 Robert Jameson (disambiguation)